Arbelodes collaris is a moth in the family Cossidae. It is found in South Africa, where it has been recorded from the Limpopo Province. The habitat consists of legume-dominated woodland.

The length of the forewings is about 12 mm. The forewings are deep olive-buff with a broad band of pale olive-buff. The hindwings are deep olive-buff.

References

Natural History Museum Lepidoptera generic names catalog

Endemic moths of South Africa
Moths described in 1921
Metarbelinae